Fucheng may refer to the following settlements in the People's Republic of China:

Fucheng County (阜城县), of Hengshui, Hebei
Fucheng District (涪城区), Mianyang, Sichuan
Fucheng Subdistrict (福城街道), Longhua District, Shenzhen

Towns
Fucheng, Beihai (福成镇), in Yinhai District, Beihai, Guangxi
Fucheng, Fucheng County (阜城镇), Hebei
Fucheng, Jiangsu (阜城镇), in Funing County

Written as "府城镇":
Fucheng, Anhui
Fucheng, Hainan
Fucheng, Wuming County, Guangxi
Fucheng, Anze County, Shanxi

Written as "附城镇":
Fucheng, Gansu, in Kangle County
Fucheng, Leizhou, Guangdong
Fucheng, Haifeng County, Guangdong
Fucheng, Jincheng, in Lingchuan County, Shanxi